Trichomycterus balios is a species of pencil catfish endemic to Brazil, where it occurs in the upper portion of the Das Antas and Caí river basins (Laguna dos Patos system), and the Mampituba river basin, in the state of Rio Grande do Sul. This species reaches a maximum length of  SL.

Etymology
The specific name balios is derived from the Greek adjective βαλιός, meaning spotted, dappled, and refers to the color pattern of the species formed by circular black blotches.

Habitat and ecology
The localities where the type specimens were collected had clear water and rocky bottoms.

T. balios feeds on larvae of Diptera (Chironomidae, Simuliidae), Lepidoptera, and Trichoptera and nymphs of Ephemeroptera and Plecoptera.

References

Further reading

External links

balios
Fish of South America
Fish of Brazil
Endemic fauna of Brazil
Fish described in 2013